Cleco Corporate Holdings LLC (formerly the Central Louisiana Electric Company) is an electric power company headquartered in the Central Louisiana city Pineville. It operates a regulated electric utility company, Cleco Power, that serves approximately 290,000 retail customers in Louisiana. Cleco also operates an unregulated wholesale electricity business, Cleco Midstream, with approximately 775 megawatts of generating capacity.

History 
Cleco's roots go back to the 1906 installation of a 25 kWh Corliss steam-driven generating plant in Bunkie, Louisiana.

In 1914, a 50 kWh diesel engine was added to the plant to produce ice and light; and in 1935, the Bunkie plant, called Louisiana Ice & Utilities, reorganized into Louisiana Ice & Electric Company.

Because ice was necessary long before electricity, ice manufacturing fostered the early development of the South's electric industry. Small steam or internal combustion electric motors powered the machinery that ran ice plants. Ice companies used power to light the plants and distributed excess energy to nearby homes and businesses. As demand increased, more facilities were needed to supply electricity and, eventually; manufacturing and delivering electricity became more important than making ice.

In 1945, the company changed its name to Central Louisiana Electric Company, Inc. (CLECO), and in 1998, to Cleco Corp. (Cleco).

On March 28, 2016, the Louisiana Public Service Commission in a 4-1 vote approved the sale of Cleco for $4.9 billion to a foreign purchasing group led by Macquarie Infrastructure and Real Assets, British Columbia Investment Management Corporation, John Hancock Financial, and other infrastructure investors. Cleco shareholders and area business leaders spoke strongly in support of the purchase. Earlier, the PSC had rejected the sale but soon reversed itself. Clyde C. Holloway, the dissenting  commissioner from Rapides Parish, expressed fear for "the long term consequences of Cleco's captive ratepayers. Cleco as we know it has ceased to exist. It is now owned by a private foreign investment company that plans to flip it in eight to ten years. And that same private foreign investment company is financing the deal with a massive amount of debt and ratepayers’ tax money. … I am proud of my 'No' vote and will continue to work hard for those folks who can't walk away." The sale was completed in April. On April 13, the company restructured and became known as Cleco Corporate Holdings LLC.

In February, 2018, Cleco Corporate Holdings LLC, owner of regulated electric utility Cleco Power, announced that it plans to acquire NRG South Central Generating LLC (South Central), a subsidiary of NRG Energy, Inc. Under the terms of the agreement, Cleco will acquire eight generating assets totaling 3,555 MW, transmission operations, and contracts to provide wholesale power to nine Louisiana cooperatives, five municipalities across Arkansas, Louisiana and Texas, and one investor-owned utility. The assets will be acquired through a new unregulated subsidiary, Cleco Cajun LLC. Upon closing, seven of the generation assets will be managed by Cleco. The Cottonwood plant in Texas will be leased back to NRG, who will operate it until May 2025. The sale is expected to close before year-end in 2018, pending regulatory approvals.

Operations
The company has approximately 1,200 employees serving approximately 290,000 customers in 24 of Louisiana's 64 parishes through its retail business and supplies wholesale power in Louisiana and Mississippi.

Cleco owns nine generating units with a total nameplate capacity of 3,310 megawatts, 12,000 miles of distribution lines and 1,300 miles of transmission lines.  

Cleco uses multiple generating sources and multiple fuels to serve its customers. In addition to power generated by Cleco units, Cleco has access to purchased power when it's needed.

References

External links 

Electric power companies of the United States
Companies based in Louisiana
Pineville, Louisiana